Jonathan Sickler is an American politician. He serves as a Republican member for the 17th district of the North Dakota Senate.

Sickler was born in Dickinson, North Dakota and raised on a farm. He attended the University of North Dakota, where he earned an undergraduate degree, and Harvard Law School, where he earned a Juris Doctor degree. He practised law in Washington, D.C., returning to North Dakota to work as a chief legal officer in Grand Forks, North Dakota. In 2022, Sickler won the election for the 17th district of the North Dakota Senate. He succeeded Ray Holmberg. Sickler assumed his office on June 2, 2022.

References 

Living people
Year of birth missing (living people)
People from Dickinson, North Dakota
Republican Party North Dakota state senators
21st-century American politicians
University of North Dakota alumni
Harvard Law School alumni
North Dakota lawyers
American businesspeople
21st-century American businesspeople